Vachellia nilotica subsp. cupressiformis is a perennial tree native to India and Pakistan.  Common names for it include kabuli kikar, ramkanta and ramkati babul.

References

nilotica subsp. cupressiformis
Plant subspecies